The Gila River Indian Community Emergency Medical Services (aka Gila River EMS) provides paramedic, ambulance and rescue services for the Gila River Indian Community. A subsidiary of the tribally owned Gila River Healthcare hospital, Gila River EMS is considered a third service model (i.e., it operates independently from both fire and police departments, and from privately owned ambulance services) and provides emergency medical and rescue services to the Gila River Indian Community in conjunction with the Gila River Police Department and the Gila River Fire Department. Gila River EMS headquarters are located in Sacaton, Arizona.

Located in southern Maricopa County and northern Pinal County, Arizona, Gila River EMS operates 7 paramedic ambulances, 1 medium duty rescue unit, 1 multi-patient support unit and 3 Advanced Life Support Command units working out of 5 stations. Gila River EMS employs approximately 80 full and part-time staff certified at the Basic EMT and Paramedic levels. All administrative staff are certified by the State of Arizona at the paramedic level.

In addition to providing 9-1-1 emergency services, the department is heavily involved in community services. It provides stand-by services for community events and operates a public relations group that attends local health fairs and community events to promote safety and health issues. It provides free CPR training, first responder and Basic EMT training. The Department administers a community-wide public access Automated external defibrillator program. Gila River EMS participates in numerous local, state and national EMS committees and organizations.

In 2007 Gila River EMS was recognized by the National Native American EMS Association as the EMS Service of the Year.

Public Safety Stations & Apparatus

References

External links
 Gila River Indian Community Emergency Medical Services 
 Gila River Healthcare 
 Gila River Indian Community 
 Central Arizona College 

Gila River Indian Community
Ambulance services in the United States
Maricopa County, Arizona
Pinal County, Arizona
Medical and health organizations based in Arizona